A New Christian was a forced convert to Christianity in Iberia.

New Christian may also refer to:
"New Christians", members of The New Church (Swedenborgian).
Members of the Christian right, sometimes known as the New Christian right
Members of Endeavor Academy, also known as New Christian Church of Full Endeavor
Members of the political party Christian Movement for a New Haiti.